Anita Mančić (born 30 September 1968) is a Serbian actress. She appeared in more than forty films since 1990.

Selected filmography

References

External links 

1968 births
Living people
People from Zemun
Actresses from Belgrade
Serbian film actresses
Serbian stage actresses
Serbian television actresses
Serbian voice actresses
Ljubinka Bobić Award winners
Zoran Radmilović Award winners
Žanka Stokić award winners